Aldo Vargas, known by his stage name Aldo Ranks, is a Panamanian musician of reggae en Español. From 1992 to 1998, he was the most outstanding and youngest rapper in Panama, supported by producers such as El Chombo and DJ Pablito on albums such as Cuentos de la Cripta ("Tales from the Crypt") and La Mafia. Ranks later joined the label Panama Music.

History 
In 1998, Vargas began his career internationally, to be present in the recording and production of Cuentos de la Cripta. Songs from the album were occupying top positions in digital sales in Costa Rica, Nicaragua, El Salvador, Honduras, Guatemala, Colombia, Venezuela, Peru and Ecuador.

In 2000, Aldo Ranks started work on the production of Cuentos de la Cripta, an album produced by El Chombo, using songs such as "Orinoco Flow" as the basis of its music.

In 2002, he composed songs such as "Dance of the Fish", "Mueve Mami", and "Murder", taken from his album titled DJ Pablito presents Aldo Ranks.

Ranks achieved great success in 2003 and 2004 with "The Fire", a song that fuses Caribbean rhythms and cadence inviting the body to "move to the erotic rhythm notes & the rap and reggae rhythm". He then embarked on a tour of South America. He then went on to produce songs such as "The Party", "Pa Rum to the World", "Carousing", and "I Cannot Forget You".

In 2006, he released his third album with the hits "The Undertakers", "The Street" and "The Helicopter". His fourth promotional single "The Nipper" became the official anthem of the Panamanian Carnival. A year later, Ranks performed the same feat once again, with production by DJ Greg on the song of that year's carnival.

In 2009, Ranks received an award from the American Society of Composers, Authors and Publishers (ASCAP) for his collaboration on the composition of "Forgive", performed by The Factory and Eddy Lover.

In 2009, he released "Trac Trac Trucutu", with a difference in style, mixing reggae with electronic beats. The songs "Make Love" and "Drunkenness 2" are a blend of roots with soca.

In 2010, Ranks collaborated with another Panamanian artist, Arthur, on a record in a retro reggae style, again under the production of producer DJ Greg.

Discography

Albums 
What's New and Best
The Conquest (produced by Panama Music)
Different
 Parrandero (2012)

Singles 
"Mueve Mami"
"The Pliers"
"Trac Trac Trucutu"
"Make Love"
"Drunkenness"
"Drunkenness 2"
"Re" (with the participation of Arthur)
"You Are Either Rich"
"Bien Loco Loco" (2016)
"Cerveza y Guaro" (2016)

See also 
 Reggae en Español
 Reggaeton

References 

1973 births
Living people
Panamanian reggaeton musicians
People from Panama City